Gordian Ward Fulde  (born 1948) is an Australian emergency medicine specialist, the founder of the Australasian College for Emergency Medicine, and was the director of the emergency department of St Vincent's Hospital in Sydney for 35 years, retiring in 2018. He was named Senior Australian of the Year in 2016.

Early life
Fulde was born in Germany in 1948 to Edwald Adolf Oskar Fulde, a thoracic surgeon, and Marie Luise Fulde, a pathologist. He migrated to Australia with his parents and older brother, Lothar, when he was one year old, settling in Bellevue Hill, a suburb in Sydney's east.

Career
Fulde studied medicine at the University of Sydney and completed his internship at St Vincent's Hospital.  He trained in general surgery, but after taking up a position at Sutherland Hospital that involved supervising the hospital's emergency department, he discovered that he preferred emergency medicine to surgery. He was the third person to register for the examinations in emergency medicine established by the Royal College of Emergency Medicine in the United Kingdom in 1983, and the first person to pass them. He founded the Australasian College for Emergency Medicine in 1984.

Fulde was appointed the Director of Emergency at St Vincent's Hospital in 1983 and held the role until his retirement in 2018; at which time he was the longest-serving director of an Australian emergency department. St Vincent's Hospital is regarded as having one of the busiest emergency departments in Australia and was the setting of reality television series Kings Cross ER, in which Fulde featured prominently. He was also the director of the Sydney Hospital emergency department and a professor of emergency medicine at the University of New South Wales and the University of Notre Dame Australia. He was a strong proponent of the Sydney lockout laws introduced in 2014 to combat alcohol-induced violence.

Fulde was named Senior Australian of the Year in 2016.

Fulde was made an Officer of the Order of Australia in 2017 for "distinguished service to emergency medicine as a clinician and administrator, to medical education, and to the community as an advocate for a range of public health issues."

Personal life
Fulde met his wife, Lesley Forster, when she was studying medicine. Their daughters, Sascha and Tiffany Fulde, are also doctors; one is an emergency specialist and the other is an anaesthetist.

References

1948 births
Living people
German emigrants to Australia
Medical doctors from Sydney
20th-century Australian medical doctors
People from the Eastern Suburbs (Sydney)
Sydney Medical School alumni
Academic staff of the University of New South Wales
University of Notre Dame Australia people
Australian emergency physicians
Australian healthcare managers
Officers of the Order of Australia